The 1st Mechanized Brigade of general Ján Golian is a subordinate component of the Ground Forces of the Slovak Republic. The headquarters of the 1st Mechanized Brigade is located in Topoľčany.

Main task 
The main task of the 1st Mechanized Brigade is to "participate in the tasks of defense and protection of vital interests of Slovak republic and its allies against military and non-military threats by conducting military and non-military operations."

History

Commanders

Organizational structure 

 HQ of the 2nd Mechanized Brigade (Topoľčany)
 Command Support Company (Martin)
 11th Mechanized Battalion (Martin)
 Headquarters Company
 3x Mechanized Companies (each with 3x Mechanized Platoons and 1x Fire Support Platoon)
 Fire Support Company (Anti-Tank Platoon, Recon Platoon & 98mm Mortar Platoon)
 12th Mechanized Battalion (Nitra)
 Headquarters Company
 3x Mechanized Companies (each with 3x Mechanized Platoons and 1x Fire Support Platoon)
 Fire Support Company (Anti-Tank Platoon, Recon Platoon & Mortar Platoon)
 13th Mechanized Battalion (Levice)
 Headquarters Company
 3x Mechanized Companies (each with 3x Mechanized Platoons and 1x Fire Support Platoon)
 Fire Support Company (Anti-Tank Platoon, Recon Platoon & Mortar Platoon)
 54th Rocket Battalion (Rožňava)
 Headquarters Battery
 3x MLRS Batteries
 Engineer Battalion (Sereď)
 Headquarters Company
 2x Pontoon Bridge Companies
 2x Technical Engineer Companies
 2x Combat Engineer Companies
 Mine Warfare Company
 NBC Defence Battalion (Rožňava)
 Headquarters Company
 NBC Recon Company
 2x Decontamination Companies
 2x NBC Defence Companies
 Medical Company
 Directly subordinate units

Equipment and weapon systems 
Small arms and portable artillery
 Pistol CZ 82 
 Model 58 assault rifle  
 Universal machine gun model 59  
 Sniper rifle SVDN 1	  
 Sniper rifle AW-50  
 Rocket-propelled grenade RPG-7	  
 OZ 9P135 M anti-tank missile launcher	  
 Mortar 81mm  
 Mortar 82mm  
 Mortar 98mm

Armoured fighting vehicles
 BRDM-2 armoured personnel carrier with 9M113 Konkurs anti-tank missile system
 BVP-2 infantry fighting vehicle (Czechoslovak and Slovak variants)	 
 OT-90 infantry fighting vehicle (Czechoslovak and Slovak BMP variant) with 9M113 Konkurs anti-tank missile system

Artillery vehicles
 RM-70/85 Modular rocket battery MLRS

Utility and transport vehicles
 Off-road vehicle Land Rover Defender 110 (utility and patrol vehicle)  
 Mercedes-Benz G-Class (utility and patrol vehicle)
 Off-road vehicle UAZ-469 B (utility and patrol vehicle, gradually decommissioned)	  
 Mercedes-Benz G-300 (military ambulance)
 Volkswagen Transporter (T4) (military ambulance)
 AKTIS 4x4 off-road transport vehicle (military transport truck)
 Tatra T-815 VVN heavy off-road transport (military transport truck)
 Tatra T-815-7 heavy off-road transport (military transport truck)  
 Tatrapan armoured personnel carrier / armoured truck (transport, logistics)
 Praga V3S off-road transport vehicle (military transport truck, gradually decommissioned)	

Engineering and specialist vehicles
 Tatra T-815 Multilift container loader  
 Crane vehicle AV-15 
 Bridgelayer vehicles
 Božena 3 mine flail and de-mining equipment

Insignia
The insignia of the 1st mechanized Brigade and its individual battalions includes coat of arms style emblems for each of the major components. The 1st Mechanized Brigade also has an honorary battle flag.

See also 
2nd Mechanized Brigade of the Slovak Ground Forces

References

Further reading 
Štaigl, J. a kolektív: Generáli - slovenská vojenská generalita 1918 – 2009 ("Generals: Slovak Military Generals 1918 - 2009"), Magnet Press, Slovakia 2009, str. 68

External links 
 Armed Forces of the Slovak Republic
 General staff of the Armed forces
 Land forces HQ
 1st mechanized brigade
 11th mechanized battalion (rapid-reaction battalion of captain Ján Francisci) 
 12th mechanized battalion
 13th mechanized battalion
 54th Rocket Artillery Battalion
 Battalion logistics support

Military units and formations of Slovakia